Einar Gunnar Bollason (born 6 November 1943) is an Icelandic former basketball player, coach and TV analyst. As a player, he won the Icelandic championship six times with KR. In 2001, he was named to the Icelandic basketball team of the 20th century and the coach of the 20th century by the Icelandic Basketball Association. In 2020, he received the Knight's Cross of the Order of the Falcon from the president of Iceland.

Early life
Einar was born in Vesturbær in Reykjavík.

Playing career

Club career
Einar came up through the junior ranks of ÍR and played his first senior games at the age of 15. He later moved to KR where he spent the bulk of his career.

Icelandic national team
Between 1964 and 1978, Einar played 35 games for the Icelandic national basketball team.

Coaching career
Einar coached the men's national team in 1974–1976, 1977, 1979–1982 and 1984–1987. During his tenures the team played 133 games, winning 57.

Team of the 20th century
In 2001 Einar was voted to the Icelandic team of the 20th century in basketball, both as a player and a coach.

Icelandic Basketball Association
Einar served as the chairman of the Icelandic Basketball Association from 1973 to 1976.

Career statistics in Icelandic top league

Guðmundur and Geirfinnur case
In 1976, Einar, along with three others, sat innocent for 105 days in solitary confinement after his sister and other suspects in the Guðmundur and Geirfinnur case (Icelandic: Guðmundar- og Geirfinnsmálið) had implicated them to the case. He had been accused falsely by his step-sister, Erla Bolladóttir of having been involved in the case during her confessions. Erla was later sentenced to jail for perjury, as part of the Reykjavik Six, while Einar was released.

References

1943 births
Living people
Einar Bollason
Einar Bollason
Einar Bollason
Einar Bollason
Einar Bollason
Einar Bollason
Einar Bollason
Einar Bollason
Einar Bollason
Einar Bollason
Einar Bollason
Einar Bollason
Einar Bollason
Einar Bollason
Einar Bollason